Grand Junction is a center of media in western Colorado.  The following is a list of media outlets based in the city.

Print

Newspapers
The Grand Junction Daily Sentinel is the city's primary newspaper, published daily. Other newspapers published in the city include:
Beacon, seniors' lifestyle, monthly
The Business Times, business news, twice monthly
The Criterion, Colorado Mesa University student newspaper, weekly
Grand Junction Free Press, weekly

Radio
The Grand Junction radio market covers all of Mesa County, Colorado. In its Fall 2013 ranking of radio markets by population, Arbitron ranked the Grand Junction market 248th in the United States.

The following is a list of radio stations that broadcast from and/or are licensed to Grand Junction.

AM

FM

Television
The Grand Junction television market includes two counties in western Colorado, Mesa County and Montrose County. In its Fall 2013 ranking of television markets by population, Arbitron ranked the Grand Junction market 185th in the United States.

The following is a list of television stations that broadcast from and/or are licensed to Grand Junction.

References

Grand Junction
Grand Junction, Colorado